Konstantynowo may refer to the following places:
Konstantynowo, Chodzież County in Greater Poland Voivodeship (west-central Poland)
Konstantynowo, Konin County in Greater Poland Voivodeship (west-central Poland)
Konstantynowo, Kuyavian-Pomeranian Voivodeship (north-central Poland)
Konstantynowo, Piła County in Greater Poland Voivodeship (west-central Poland)
Konstantynowo, Poznań County in Greater Poland Voivodeship (west-central Poland)
Konstantynowo, Środa Wielkopolska County in Greater Poland Voivodeship (west-central Poland)